Vladimir Alekseyevich Ryzhkin (29 December 1930 – 19 May 2011) was a Soviet football player.

Honours
 Olympic champion: 1956.
 Soviet Top League winner: 1954, 1955, 1957.
 Soviet Cup winner: 1953.

International career
Ryzhkin made his debut for USSR on 21 October 1956 in a friendly against France.

References

External links
  Profile
 

1930 births
Footballers from Moscow
2011 deaths
Russian footballers
Soviet footballers
Soviet Union international footballers
Olympic footballers of the Soviet Union
Footballers at the 1956 Summer Olympics
Olympic gold medalists for the Soviet Union
Soviet Top League players
PFC CSKA Moscow players
FC Dynamo Moscow players
Daugava Rīga players
Olympic medalists in football
Association football forwards
Medalists at the 1956 Summer Olympics